Roth an der Our is a municipality in the district of Bitburg-Prüm, in Rhineland-Palatinate, western Germany.

References

External links
 Roth an der Our at site of VG Neuerburg

Bitburg-Prüm